The Perfect 10 is a sports documentary about the 10 Heisman Trophy winners who also got enshrined into the Pro Football Hall of Fame produced by Fox Sports Films, Tim Brown, Hall of Fame Village Media, H2H Productions, and NFL Films. The Perfect 10 premiered on February 11, 2023, at 8 P.M. on Fox, the night before Super Bowl LVII.

Plot

The Perfect 10 brings together seven of the 10 legendary football players who have won the Heisman Trophy and entered the Pro Football Hall of Fame to share their life journeys to winning the Heisman Trophy and entering the Pro Football Hall of Fame. The players who sat down for this conversation are Marcus Allen, Tim Brown, Earl Campbell, Tony Dorsett, Barry Sanders, Roger Staubach, and Charles Woodson. The film examines the motivation, impact, and ability to achieve their sustained excellence while going deep into each player's life and career. The film also goes into the off-field aspects of their character and the personal details of their past that define them.

The Perfect 10 members

Production
The Perfect 10 was produced in partnership with Fox Sports Films, Hall of Fame Village Media, Heisman Trophy Winner and Pro Football Hall of Famer Tim Brown, H2H Productions and NFL Films. The Perfect 10 is directed by four-time Emmy winner Steve Trout, who also directed Hard Knocks and All or Nothing. The Perfect 10 is narrated by two-time Emmy Award-winning actor Andre Braugher, who also appeared in Thief and Brooklyn Nine-Nine. Eric Shanks, Mark Silverman, Charlie Dixon and Barry Nugent from FOX Sports also serve as executive producers.

Release
The Perfect 10 premiered on February 11, 2023, the night before Super Bowl LVII at 8 P.M. on Fox

References

2023 television films
2023 films
2023 documentary films
Documentary films about American football
American sports documentary films
NFL Films
Fox Broadcasting Company original programming
Fox Sports original programming
2020s English-language films
2020s American films
O. J. Simpson